The Sako M23 is a Finnish battle rifle designed by Sako in cooperation with the Finnish Defence Forces and manufactured by Sako. The Swedish Armed Forces also participated in the development program for the M23.

The Finnish Defence Forces have adopted the rifle in two configurations, as the 7.62 KIV 23 (from Finnish , 'rifle 2023'),  designated marksman rifle variant and 7.62 TKIV 23 (from Finnish , 'sniper rifle 2023') sniper rifle variant, which are to enter service in 2023. The M23 is based on the AR-10 and AR-15 design by Eugene Stoner but unlike the original designs, it features a short-stroke gas piston system.

History
In May 2020 the Finnish Defence Forces announced that they had signed a letter of intent with Sako for the development of a new rifle system in two configurations, one for infantry designated marksmen and one as a sniper rifle. The new rifle system was planned as a complete replacement for the existing Dragunov sniper rifle and as a partial replacement for the TKIV 85 sniper rifle. The Inspector of the Infantry, Colonel Rainer Peltoniemi specified that the rifle system should be deliverable in 2022, be chambered in 7.62×51mm NATO and be more ergonomic than the previous systems. He noted, that at the time the K22 program didn't have other participating nations, but other nations could join should they have similar needs for a rifle and a similar schedule.

In April 2021 the Finnish Defence Forces announced that they had signed an information exchange agreement with the Swedish Armed Forces concerning small arms. The Commander of the Finnish Army, Lieutenant General Petri Hulkko said in a press conference in October 2021 that Sweden was participating in the K22 program.

On 21 December 2021 the Finnish Defence Forces announced the procurement of the M23 in the planned two configurations, at an initial price of €10 million, with an option of up to €525 million. The purchase includes also equipment for the rifle, spare parts, servicing equipment and training for the system by Sako. At the same time, the Minister of Defence of Finland Antti Kaikkonen also authorised the Finnish Defence Forces to perform a joint acquisition with Sweden. Sweden intends to replace its AK 4D rifle with the M23.

Design
 
The Sako M23 is based on the American AR-10 and AR-15 design by Eugene Stoner. The action of the M23, however, features a short stroke gas piston, a departure from Stoner's original gas system.

As displayed in the announcement of the adoption of the rifle system by the Finnish Defence Forces, and confirmed by Maj Mika Mäenpää, the rifle features a telescoping Magpul CTR stock, green ceramic surface treatment, ambidextrous controls, has a full length NATO Accessory Rail (STANAG 4694) on top of the receiver and handguard for sights and M-LOK rail on the handguard for various accessories. FDF issued kit of the M23 includes 10 and 20 round magazines, bipod and an Ase Utra sound suppressor. The TKIV 23 has a Steiner Optics M7Xi 2.9–20×50 telescopic sight with the Finnaccuracy MSR reticle variant MSR FDF reticle, while the KIV 23 has a Trijicon VCOG 1–6×24 telescopic sight.

Finnish Defence Forces also has specifically designed ammunition for the Sako M23, which can also be used in the MG 3 and FN MAG which FDF uses.

Variants
K22 – prototype.
7.62 KIV 23 – FDF designated marksman rifle variant.
7.62 TKIV 23 – FDF sniper rifle variant.

Users

See also
M110 Semi-Automatic Sniper System
Heckler & Koch HK417

References

7.62×51mm NATO battle rifles
Sniper rifles of Finland
7.62×51mm NATO rifles
Short stroke piston firearms
Designated marksman rifles
ArmaLite AR-10 derivatives
Weapons and ammunition introduced in 2022